François Malkovsky (1889–1982) was a French choreographer.

References 

1889 births
1982 deaths
French choreographers